Jelovica is a karst plateau in northwestern Slovenia. It is the easternmost part of the Julian Alps and is overgrown by spruce forest.

Iron ore was dug in Jelovica in the past. During World War II, Jelovica was a refuge for the Slovene Partisans. Nowadays, it is a protected area as part of the Natura 2000 network.

References

External links

Plateaus in Upper Carniola
Julian Alps
Karst plateaus of Slovenia
Natura 2000 in Slovenia